Cape Freycinet is a point on the coast between Cape Leeuwin and Cape Naturaliste in the south west of Western Australia.

It is within the Shire of Augusta-Margaret River local government area, and the Leeuwin-Naturaliste National Park.

It is not far from the Lake Cave and is approached from the Caves Road along Conto Road.

Named after the family of Freycinet, which had two brothers Henri Desaules and Louis de Freycinetwho were on the Baudin expedition.

The late Leslie Marchant in his posthumous publication on French names in Western Australia insists that it is not a cape, but a pointand names it Point Freycinet counter to the established name listed by Geoscience Australia database.

See also
 Cape Clairault
 Cape Mentelle
 Hamelin Bay

Further reading

 Edward Duyker François Péron: An Impetuous Life: Naturalist and Voyager, Miegunyah/MUP, Melb., 2006, 
 Fornasiero, Jean; Monteath, Peter and West-Sooby, John.  Encountering Terra Australis: the Australian voyages of Nicholas Baudin and Matthew Flinders, Kent Town, South Australia, Wakefield Press, 2004. 
Frank Horner, The French Reconnaissance: Baudin in Australia 1801—1803, Melbourne University Press, Melbourne, 1987 .
 Marchant, Leslie R. French Napoleonic Placenames of the South West Coast, Greenwood, WA. R.I.C. Publications, 2004.

External links
 https://web.archive.org/web/20070930181322/http://www.ga.gov.au/bin/gazd01?rec=268692 - Geoscience reference to Cape

Freycinet
Leeuwin-Naturaliste National Park